Jean-François Bachelot (born 11 June 1977) is a former tour professional tennis player from France.

Playing style
Bachelot played with typical French "flair", possessing a powerful serve and groundstrokes, whilst being comfortable at the net.

Singles titles

Wins (2)

Runners-up (1)

Doubles titles

Wins (8)

Runners-up (4)

External links
 
 

1977 births
Living people
French male tennis players
Sportspeople from Perpignan
Sportspeople from Toulouse